Mihal Gjika (born 3 January 1947) is an Albanian footballer. He played in twelve matches for the Albania national football team from 1971 to 1974.

References

External links
 

1947 births
Living people
Albanian footballers
Albania international footballers
Place of birth missing (living people)
Association footballers not categorized by position